= Ghabutra =

- Union council
- Location within Pakistan
- Coordinates: 33.28°N 73.19°E
- Country: Pakistan
- Province: (Islamabad Capital Territory) Islamabad C.T
- Elevation: 575 m (1,886 ft)

Population
  - Total: 42,231
- Time zone: UTC+5 (PST)

Ghabutra is a union council in the Islamabad Capital Territory of Pakistan. It is located at 33° 28' 20N 73° 19' 0E with an altitude of 575 metres (1889 feet).
